Chad Edward Mendes (born May 1, 1985) is an American professional bare-knuckle boxer and former mixed martial artist and collegiate wrestler who is currently signed to Bare Knuckle Fighting Championship (BKFC). Mendes gained notoriety competing in the featherweight division of the Ultimate Fighting Championship (UFC), where he was a three-time UFC championship challenger. Competing as a Cal Poly Mustang, he was a two-time NCAA Division I All-American and a Pac-10 Conference champion in folkstyle wrestling.

Wrestling career

NCAA
Mendes wrestled for Cal Poly in San Luis Obispo, California. He finished his career with an overall record of 64–14 and twice earned NCAA All-American honors at 125 pounds as a sophomore, then 141 pounds as a senior. As a senior, Mendes finished the year with a 30–1 record; he placed 2nd in the 2008 NCAA championships at 141 lb., falling to Ohio State's J Jaggers in the title match. That year, Mendes was Pac-10 Wrestler of the Year.

Mixed martial arts career

Early career
After the conclusion of his collegiate career, Mendes began to train mixed martial arts with Team Alpha Male. He began fighting for the Palace Fighting Championship and went undefeated.

World Extreme Cagefighting
Mendes made his WEC debut against Erik Koch on March 6, 2010 at WEC 47. He won the fight via unanimous decision, despite a cut over his right eye that was examined during the fight to see if he could continue.

Mendes faced Anthony Morrison, replacing an injured Mackens Semerzier, on April 24, 2010 at WEC 48. He won the bout via first round submission.

Mendes faced Cub Swanson on August 18, 2010 at WEC 50. He won the fight via unanimous decision (30–27, 29–28, and 29–28).

Mendes faced Javier Vazquez on November 11, 2010 at WEC 52 and defeated him via unanimous decision.  Mendes was able to utilize his improved striking to complement his superior wrestling to dictate where he wanted to take the action. During the fight, Mendes used an unorthodox move when he front flipped on Vazquez who was on the ground, to land on him.

Ultimate Fighting Championship
On October 28, 2010, World Extreme Cagefighting merged with the Ultimate Fighting Championship. As part of the merger, all WEC fighters were transferred to the UFC.

Mendes made his UFC debut against returning veteran and judo black belt Michihiro Omigawa on February 5, 2011 at UFC 126. He won the fight via unanimous decision.

Following UFC 129, Dana White mentioned in the post-fight press conference that Mendes may have a shot at the title against UFC featherweight champion José Aldo. Although the two were expected to fight on August 6, 2011 at UFC 133, Aldo would be sidelined until October recovering from various injuries sustained during his fight with Mark Hominick. Mendes instead faced Rani Yahya at the event. He won the fight via unanimous decision.

Mendes fought UFC Featherweight Champion José Aldo on January 14, 2012 at UFC 142, losing at 4:59 of the first round via KO, giving Mendes his first professional loss.

Mendes next faced Cody McKenzie on July 7, 2012 at UFC 148. He won the fight via first-round TKO due to a body punch.

Mendes was expected to face Hacran Dias on December 15, 2012 at UFC on FX 6.  However, in just days before the event, Dias pulled out of the bout, citing a shoulder injury, and he was replaced by promotional newcomer Yaotzin Meza. Mendes defeated Meza via KO at 3:38 in the first round.

Mendes was expected to face Manvel Gamburyan on February 23, 2013 at UFC 157.  However, Gamburyan pulled out of the bout, citing a thumb injury.  Subsequently, Mendes was pulled from the card as a suitable replacement could not be found on short notice.

Mendes was expected to face Clay Guida on April 20, 2013 at UFC on Fox 7.  However, it was revealed on March 15 that Guida had pulled out of the bout, citing an injury, and he was replaced by Darren Elkins. Mendes won the fight by TKO at 1:08 in the first round.

A rescheduled bout with Guida took place on August 31, 2013 at UFC 164. After a close first and second round, Mendes finished Guida via TKO by punches in the third round and became the first man to ever finish Guida by strikes. The win also earned Mendes his first Knockout of the Night bonus award.

Mendes faced Nik Lentz on December 14, 2013 at UFC on Fox 9. He won the fight via unanimous decision.

A rematch with José Aldo was expected to take place on August 2, 2014, as the event headliner at UFC 176 for the UFC Featherweight Championship. However, in early July, Aldo pulled out of the bout with an injury. The rematch with Aldo was subsequently rescheduled and took place on October 25, 2014, at UFC 179. He became the first man to knock down Aldo dropping him with a left hand in the first round. Mendes and Aldo both rocked each other with clean punches, Mendes would go on to lose the fight via unanimous decision. Despite the loss on the scorecards, Mendes was awarded his first Fight of the Night bonus award for the bout. The fight won World MMA Awards 2015 fight of the year award.

Mendes faced Ricardo Lamas on April 4, 2015 in the main event at UFC Fight Night 63. Mendes won the fight via TKO in the first round.  The win also earned Mendes his first Performance of the Night bonus award.

On May 18, 2015, Dana White tweeted that Chad Mendes had agreed to an eight-fight contract with UFC.

José Aldo was expected to face Conor McGregor on July 11, 2015 at UFC 189 for the undisputed UFC Featherweight Championship. However, in the days leading up to the fight, Aldo pulled out of the bout because of a rib injury he sustained in training. Mendes stepped in as a short notice replacement to face McGregor for the interim championship. Mendes lost the fight via TKO in the second round.

Mendes faced Frankie Edgar on December 11, 2015 at The Ultimate Fighter 22 Finale. He lost the fight via knockout in the first round.

After returning from his suspension and two-and-a-half years away from the sport, Mendes faced Myles Jury on July 14, 2018 at UFC Fight Night 133. He won the fight via TKO in the first round. This win earned him the Performance of the Night award.

Mendes faced Alexander Volkanovski on December 29, 2018 at UFC 232. He lost the fight via TKO in the second round. This fight earned both participants Fight of the Night honors. Following the loss, Mendes announced his retirement from the sport.

Bare-Knuckle Fighting Championship
On August 4, 2021, Mendes announced that he was released from his UFC contract by his own request and signed a multi-fight contract with Bare Knuckle Fighting Championship. However, he later reiterated that he was still under contract with the UFC, but was given exemption to compete in bare-knuckle. He was initially expected to make his debut at a BKFC event on October 22, 2021, but that was postponed on two occasions. He debuted on February 19, 2022 at KnuckleMania 2 defeating Joshuah Alvarez by technical knockout.

Doping violations and suspension 
On June 10, 2016, the UFC announced that Mendes had been informed of a potential doping violation stemming from an out-of-competition test conducted by USADA. Mendes responded, "I didn't do my homework and that was a big mistake. I own it and I'm going to pay for it." He claims the cause was from a topical cream used to treat his psoriasis, however, on July 20, 2016, USADA reported that Mendes tested positive for GHRP-6, a growth hormone release stimulator, and suspended Mendes for 2 years. He was not eligible to compete again until June 10, 2018.

Submission grappling

Mendes competed in Submission Underground 3 on January 30, 2017, where he defeated Brazilian jiu-jitsu world champion and 27 time Grapplers Quest champion, Jeff Glover in overtime.

Personal life
Mendes is of Portuguese, Italian, Puerto Rican, Irish, and Native American descent.

Mendes and his wife Abby have a daughter (born 2019).

Mendes founded the hunting and fishing guide service Finz and Featherz.

Mendes was charged with battery for his alleged involvement in a bar fight on July 29, 2012 in his hometown of Hanford, California. The Kings County District Attorney's Office announced on August 25, 2012, that it would seek a battery charge against Mendes. The charges were dropped after Mendes pleaded no contest to a count of public disturbance and paid a fine.

Championships and accomplishments

Mixed martial arts
Ultimate Fighting Championship
Knockout of the Night (One time) 
Fight of the Night (Two times) 
Performance of the Night (Two times) 
Most knockouts in UFC Featherweight history (6) - tied with Conor McGregor
World MMA Awards
2014 Fight of the Year vs. José Aldo at UFC 179
ESPN
 2014 Fight of the Year vs. José Aldo at UFC 179
BloodyElbow.com
2014 Fight of the Year vs. José Aldo at UFC 179
MMAJunkie.com
2014 Fight of the Year vs. José Aldo at UFC 179
2014 October Fight of the Month vs. José Aldo

Collegiate wrestling
National Collegiate Athletic Association
NCAA Division I All-American (2006, 2008)
Pac-10 Conference Championship (2008)
Pac-10 Conference Wrestler of the Year (2008)
NCAA Division I 125 lb: 6th place out of Cal Poly (2006)
NCAA Division I 141 lb: Runner-up out of Cal Poly (2008)

Mixed martial arts record

|-
|Loss
|align=center|18–5
|Alexander Volkanovski
| TKO (punches)
|UFC 232 
|
|align=center|2
|align=center|4:14
|Inglewood, California, United States
|
|-
|Win
|align=center|18–4
|Myles Jury
| TKO (punches)
|UFC Fight Night: dos Santos vs. Ivanov 
|
|align=center|1
|align=center|2:51
|Boise, Idaho, United States
|
|-
|Loss
|align=center|17–4
|Frankie Edgar
|KO (punch)
|The Ultimate Fighter: Team McGregor vs. Team Faber Finale
|
|align=center|1
|align=center|2:28
|Las Vegas, Nevada, United States
|
|-
|Loss
|align=center|17–3
|Conor McGregor
|TKO (punches) 
|UFC 189
|
|align=center|2
|align=center|4:57
|Las Vegas, Nevada, United States
|
|-
| Win
| align=center| 17–2
| Ricardo Lamas
| TKO (punches)
| UFC Fight Night: Mendes vs. Lamas
| 
| align=center| 1
| align=center| 2:45
| Fairfax, Virginia, United States
| 
|-
| Loss
| align=center| 16–2
| José Aldo
| Decision (unanimous)
| UFC 179
| 
| align=center| 5
| align=center| 5:00
| Rio de Janeiro, Brazil
| 
|-
| Win
| align=center| 16–1
| Nik Lentz
| Decision (unanimous)
| UFC on Fox: Johnson vs. Benavidez 2
| 
| align=center| 3
| align=center| 5:00
| Sacramento, California, United States
| 
|-
| Win
| align=center| 15–1
| Clay Guida
| TKO (punches)
| UFC 164
| 
| align=center| 3
| align=center| 0:30
| Milwaukee, Wisconsin, United States
| 
|-
| Win
| align=center| 14–1
| Darren Elkins
| KO (punches)
| UFC on Fox: Henderson vs. Melendez
| 
| align=center| 1
| align=center| 1:08
| San Jose, California, United States
| 
|-
| Win
| align=center| 13–1
| Yaotzin Meza
| KO (punches)
| UFC on FX: Sotiropoulos vs. Pearson
| 
| align=center| 1
| align=center| 1:55
| Gold Coast, Australia
| 
|-
| Win
| align=center| 12–1
| Cody McKenzie
| TKO (punch to the body)
| UFC 148
| 
| align=center| 1
| align=center| 0:31
| Las Vegas, Nevada, United States
| 
|-
| Loss
| align=center| 11–1
| José Aldo
| KO (knee)
| UFC 142
| 
| align=center| 1
| align=center| 4:59
| Rio de Janeiro, Brazil
| 
|-
| Win
| align=center| 11–0
| Rani Yahya
| Decision (unanimous)
| UFC 133
| 
| align=center| 3
| align=center| 5:00
| Philadelphia, Pennsylvania, United States
| 
|-
| Win
| align=center| 10–0
| Michihiro Omigawa
| Decision (unanimous)
| UFC 126
| 
| align=center| 3
| align=center| 5:00
| Las Vegas, Nevada, United States
| 
|-
| Win
| align=center| 9–0
| Javier Vazquez
| Decision (unanimous)
| WEC 52
| 
| align=center| 3
| align=center| 5:00
| Las Vegas, Nevada, United States
| 
|-
| Win
| align=center| 8–0
| Cub Swanson
| Decision (unanimous)
| WEC 50
| 
| align=center| 3
| align=center| 5:00
| Las Vegas, Nevada, United States
| 
|-
| Win
| align=center| 7–0
| Anthony Morrison
| Submission (guillotine choke)
| WEC 48
| 
| align=center| 1
| align=center| 2:13
| Sacramento, California, United States
| 
|-
| Win
| align=center| 6–0
| Erik Koch
| Decision (unanimous)
| WEC 47
| 
| align=center| 3
| align=center| 5:00
| Columbus, Ohio, United States
| 
|-
| Win
| align=center| 5–0
| Mike Joy
| Decision (unanimous)
| Tachi Palace Fights 1
| 
| align=center| 3
| align=center| 5:00
| Lemoore, California, United States
| 
|-
| Win
| align=center| 4–0
| Steven Siler
| KO (punches)
| TPF: Best of Both Worlds
| 
| align=center| 1
| align=center| 0:44
| Lemoore, California, United States
| 
|-
| Win
| align=center| 3–0
| Art Arciniega
| Decision (unanimous)
| PFC: Best of Both Worlds 2
| 
| align=center| 3
| align=center| 3:00
| Lemoore, California, United States
| 
|-
| Win
| align=center| 2–0
| Leland Gridley
| TKO (punches)
| PFC: Best of Both Worlds
| 
| align=center| 2
| align=center| 1:58
| Lemoore, California, United States
| 
|-
| Win
| align=center| 1–0
| Giovanni Encarnacion
| Submission (rear-naked choke)
| PFC 10: Explosive
| 
| align=center| 1
| align=center| 2:06
| Lemoore, California, United States
|

Pay-per-view bouts

Bare knuckle record

|-
|
|
|Eddie Alvarez
|
|BKFC 41
|April 29, 2023
|
|
|Denver, Colorado, United Stated
|
|-
|Win
|align=center|1–0
|Joshuah Alvarez
|TKO (punches)
|BKFC: KnuckleMania 2
|
|align=center|4
|align=center|1:34
|Hollywood, Florida, United States
|
|-

NCAA record

! colspan="8"| NCAA Championships Matches
|-
!  Res.
!  Record
!  Opponent
!  Score
!  Date
!  Event
|-
! style=background:white colspan=6 |2008 NCAA Championships  at 141 lbs
|-
|Loss
|10-5
|align=left|J Jaggers
|style="font-size:88%"|2-5
|style="font-size:88%" rowspan=5|March 22, 2008
|style="font-size:88%" rowspan=5|2008 NCAA Division I Wrestling Championships
|-
|Win
|10-4
|align=left|Nathan Morgan
|style="font-size:88%"|1-0
|-
|Win
|9-4
|align=left|Nick Gallick
|style="font-size:88%"|5-0
|-
|Win
|8-4
|align=left|Ryan Williams
|style="font-size:88%"|7-4
|-
|Win
|7-4
|align=left|Steve Adamcsik
|style="font-size:88%"|Fall
|-
! style=background:white colspan=6 |2006 NCAA Championships 6th at 125 lbs
|-
|Loss
|6-4
|align=left|Sam Hazewinkel
|style="font-size:88%"|1-7
|style="font-size:88%" rowspan=6|March 17, 2006
|style="font-size:88%" rowspan=6|2006 NCAA Division I Wrestling Championships
|-
|Win
|6-3
|align=left|John Velez
|style="font-size:88%"|7-4
|-
|Win
|5-3
|align=left|Kyle Ott
|style="font-size:88%"|Fall
|-
|Loss
|4-3
|align=left|Nick Simmons
|style="font-size:88%"|Fall
|-
|Win
|4-2
|align=left|Chad Sportelli
|style="font-size:88%"|3-2
|-
|Win
|3-2
|align=left|Brad Gentzle
|style="font-size:88%"|Fall
|-
! style=background:white colspan=6 |2005 NCAA Championships at 133 lbs
|-
|Loss
|2-2
|align=left|Mark Jayne
|style="font-size:88%"|6-7
|style="font-size:88%" rowspan=5|March 18, 2005
|style="font-size:88%" rowspan=5|2005 NCAA Division I Wrestling Championships
|-
|Loss
|2-1
|align=left|Mack Reiter
|style="font-size:88%"|3-8
|-
|Win
|2-0
|align=left|Matt Ciasulli
|style="font-size:88%"|6-4
|-
|Win
|1-0
|align=left|Evan Sola
|style="font-size:88%"|Fall
|-

See also
 List of current UFC fighters
 List of male mixed martial artists

References

External links
 
 

1986 births
Living people
People from Hanford, California
American people of Irish descent
American people of Italian descent
American people of Portuguese descent
American people of Puerto Rican descent
American people who self-identify as being of Native American descent
American sportspeople in doping cases
Doping cases in mixed martial arts
Native American sportspeople
American male mixed martial artists
Mixed martial artists from California
People from Kings County, California
Featherweight mixed martial artists
Mixed martial artists utilizing collegiate wrestling
American male sport wrestlers
Ultimate Fighting Championship male fighters